The following lists events in the year 2016 in Romania.

Incumbents
President: Klaus Iohannis
Prime Minister: Dacian Cioloș

Events

January 
 29 January – President Klaus Iohannis promulgates a law banning smoking in public areas, two days after the CCR declared it constitutional.

February 
 5 February – Five people are killed and 28 seriously injured after a bus and a tip lorry collide on the Western Belt of Ploiești.
 10 February – Former commander of Râmnicu Sărat Penitentiary Alexandru Vișinescu is sentenced to 20 years imprisonment for crimes against humanity, becoming the first communist torturer to be convicted in Romania.
 16 February 
 The warmest day of February of the last 55 years, with temperatures 18 °C higher than the normal in Bucharest.
 Three babies die and several dozens from Prahova, Dolj and Bucharest are hospitalized with HUS-associated symptoms after being infected with a bacterium of unknown provenance.

March 
 14 March – The death toll of the Colectiv nightclub fire reaches 64, almost five months after the tragedy.

May 
 9 May – Minister of Health Patriciu Achimaș-Cadariu resigns due to mismanagement of the diluted disinfectants crisis.
 12 May – US and NATO officials activate a land-based missile defense station at Deveselu, part of a larger and controversial European shield.
 29 May – 20 people are injured after a footbridge breaks during an electoral event in Plopu, Prahova County.

June 
 1 June – About 10,000 employees in the education system protest in Bucharest, demanding the resignation of the Cioloș Cabinet, dissatisfied with the teacher pay scale proposed by the Government.
 5 June – Local elections are held across Romania. The Social Democratic Party comes in first with 38.98% of mayor seats nationwide, including Bucharest, followed by the National Liberal Party with 31.50%.

July 
 5 June – Prime Minister Dacian Cioloş announces a cabinet shuffle as the four ministers (Education, Transport, Communications and Diaspora) are replaced. The new ministers took office on 7 July.

September 
 13 September – French President François Hollande begins a one-day state visit to Romania, the first state visit by a French president since François Mitterrand came to Romania in 1991.
 24 September – A magnitude 5.3 earthquake strikes Vrancea County, with tremors being felt as far as Bucharest and the Republic of Moldova. This is the largest deep earthquake since 2009.

November
 5 November – A 29-car pile-up on Sun Motorway results in four deaths and nearly 60 injuries.

December
 2 December – A shooting left at least 3 people dead including the gunman and another 2 were injured. The shooting occurred in Palilula a village in Dolj County.
 11 December – 2016 Romanian legislative election

Sports
2 March – 2015–16 Cupa României: 1st leg semi-final
20 April – 2015–16 Cupa Romaniei: 2nd leg semi-final
8 May – CSM București wins the Women's EHF Champions League trophy, after beating Győri Audi ETO KC by a score of 29–26 (13–12, 22–22), after overtime and 7-meter throws, in the final held at the László Papp Sports Arena in Budapest.
14 May – 2016 Cupa României Final
10 June – UEFA Euro 2016 Group A: France v. Romania
15 June – UEFA Euro 2016 Group A: Romania v. Switzerland
19 June – UEFA Euro 2016 Group A: Romania v. Albania
5–21 August – 88 members of the Romanian national team will compete in the 2016 Summer Olympics in Rio de Janeiro, Brazil.

Arts and entertainment
Lara Fabian returns to Romania for two new concerts, in Cluj-Napoca, on 20 April, and Bucharest, on 22 April.
22 April – Romania is expelled from the Eurovision Song Contest 2016 after its national broadcaster TVR failed to pay debts dating back to 2007. This is the first time in the 61-year history of the Eurovision Song Contest a country is expelled from the competition.
18–22 May – The seventh edition of International Poetry Festival takes place in Bucharest, having as guests more than 100 poets from more than 20 countries.
11 June – Dutch violinist André Rieu and Johann Strauss Orchestra will concert in Bucharest.
21 June – Queen and Adam Lambert will concert for the first time in Romania, in the Constitution Square of Bucharest.
4–7 August – The second edition of Untold Festival will take place in Cluj-Napoca.

Deaths

January

 2 January – George Alexandru, actor (b. 1957)
 7 January – Cristian Moisescu, Mayor of Arad (1992–96) (b. 1947)
 10 January – Teofil Codreanu, footballer (b. 1941)
 12 January – Melania Ursu, actress (b. 1940)
 16 January – Theodor Danetti, actor (b. 1926)
 17 January – Ion Panțuru, bobsledder (b. 1934)
 18 January – Silvia Kerim, journalist and children's books writer (b. 1932)
 22 January – Constantin Mihail, athletics coach (b. 1945)
 23 January – Elisabeta Polihroniade, chess player (b. 1935)
 26 January – Aurora Dumitrescu, history teacher and political prisoner (b. 1932)
 27 January – Elena Negreanu, actress and film director (b. 1918)
 31 January – Miron Chichișan, Mayor of Zalău (1992–96) (b. 1945)

February

 9 February – Alexandru Vulpe, historian and archaeologist, member of Romanian Academy (b. 1931)
 10 February – Stan Gheorghiu, football player and coach (b. 1949)
 16 February – Mircea Costache II, handball player (b. 1940)
 17 February – Gelu Barbu, ballerino and choreographer (b. 1932)
 18 February – Rudolf Fischer, historian and linguist (b. 1923)
 21 February – Pascal Bentoiu, composer and musicologist (b. 1927)
 28 February – Gheorghe Blănaru, writer (b. 1933)

March

 3 March – Gheorghe Tokay, politician (b. 1939)
 8 March
 Chiriac Bucur, writer and diplomat (b. 1932)
 Sorin Toma, journalist and politician (b. 1914)
 11 March – Iolanda Balaș, Olympic high jumper (b. 1936)
 17 March
 Solomon Marcus, mathematician, member of Romanian Academy (b 1925)
 Paula Sorescu-Lucian, theatre actress (b. 1942)
 18 March – Șerban Iliescu, journalist and linguist (b. 1955)
 26 March – Radu Mareș, writer (b. 1941)
 27 March – Mihail Coculescu, endocrinologist, member of Romanian Academy (b. 1943)
 28 March – Petru Mocanu, mathematician, member of Romanian Academy (b. 1931)
 30 March – Aristotel Stamatoiu, director of Romanian Intelligence Service (1986–1990) (b. 1929)

April

 5 April – Cornel Patrichi, ballerino, choreographer and actor (b. 1944)
 6 April – Nicolae Munteanu, sports journalist (b. 1922 or 1923)
 7 April – Fane Spoitoru, businessman (b. 1959)
 8 April – Mircea Albulescu, actor (b. 1934)
 13 April – Márton Balázs, mathematician (b. 1929)
 21 April – Valeriu Cotea, oenologist, member of Romanian Academy (b. 1926)
 25 April
 Dumitru Antonescu, footballer (b. 1945)
 Neculai Rățoi, Mayor of Pașcani (b. 1939)
 29 April – Gianu Bucurescu, director of Securitate (1985–1989) (b. 1934)

May

 13 May – Doina Florica Ignat, politician, member of the Senate of Romania (b. 1938)
 14 May – Neculai Alexandru Ursu, linguist, philologist and literary historian (b. 1926)
 17 May – Alexandru Lăpușan, politician, Minister of Agriculture (b. 1955)
 20 May 
 Vasile Duță, politician, member of the Senate of Romania (b. 1955)
 Bogdan Ulmu, theatre director and writer (b. 1951)
 22 May – Dan Condrea, businessman (b. 1975)
 25 May – József Tempfli, Roman Catholic bishop (b. 1931)
 26 May – Ted Dumitru, football manager (b. 1939)
 30 May – Andrei Ciontu, engineer (b. 1933)
31 May – Mihail Gabriel Corgoja, economist (b. 1977)

June

 1 June – Grigore Obreja, sprint canoeist (b. 1967)
 5 June – Lucian Gheorghiu, journalist (b. 1955)
 6 June – Mihai Dragolea, writer (b. 1955)
 8 June
 Alexandru Bizim, athletics coach (b. 1934)
 Gheorghe Buluță, philologist (b. 1947)
 10 June – Nicolae Păsărică, oină player (b. 1955)
 11 June – Sigismund Gram, footballer (b. 1933)
 13 June
Viorel Mihai Ciobanu, jurist and university professor (b. 1950)
Ioan-Liviu Negruț, politician, member of the Chamber of Deputies of Romania (b. 1937)
 14 June – Ilie Călian, journalist (b. 1942)
 18 June
 Mircea Chiorean, physician, co-founder of SMURD (b. 1933)
 Nae Cosmescu, theatre and television director (b. 1940)
 19 June
 Mihnea Berindei, historian (b. 1948)
 Nicolae Bocșan, historian (b. 1947)
 Victor Stănculescu, general officer and politician (b. 1928)

July

 1 July
 Ion Ianoși, writer and essayist (b. 1928)
 Gheorghe Drobotă, rugby union player (b. 1934)
 2 July – Elie Wiesel, writer, professor, political activist, Nobel laureate and Holocaust survivor (b. 1928)
 8 July – Dan Dermengiu, physician (b. 1957)
 11 July – Dale Băsescu, actor (b. 1956)
 18 July – Medi Wechsler Dinu, painter (b. 1908)
 20 July
 Radu Beligan, actor (b. 1918)
 Nicolae Duță, rugby union player (b. 1943 or 1944)
 21 July – Alexandru Jidveianu, singer (b. 1968)
 28 July – Constantin Busuioceanu, director, editor and lecturer (b. 1924)

August

 1 August – Queen Anne of Romania (b. 1923)
 3 August – Paul Gherasim, painter (b. 1925)
 4 August – Alexandru Mészáros, footballer (b. 1933)
 5 August – Ionel Lupu, dendrologist (b. 1934)
 6 August – Iosif Viehmann, speleologist (b. 1925)
 7 August – Nicolae Mărășescu, athletics coach and politician (b. 1937)
 12 August – Dénes Sándor, professor (b. 1936)
 19 August – Adrian Enescu, musician and composer (b. 1948)
 21 August – Marin Moraru, actor (b. 1937)

September

 1 September – Victoria Darvai, folk singer (b. 1926)
 25 September – Niculae Mircovici, officer and politician (b. 1950)
 26 September – Ioan Gyuri Pascu, musician and actor (b. 1961)
 27 September
 Sebastian Papaiani, actor (b. 1936)
 Aurelian Preda, folk singer (b. 1970)

October

 4 October – Ion Ochinciuc, writer and playwright (b. 1927)
 9 October – Marin Petrache Pechea, jazz singer and saxophonist (b. 1944)
 19 October – Radu Câmpeanu, politician (b. 1922)
 20 October – Valeriu Moisescu, theatre director and university professor (b. 1932)
 21 October 
 Vasile Andru, writer, theoretician and essayist (b. 1942)
 Constantin Frățilă, footballer (b. 1942)
 25 October 
 Margit Bara, actress (b. 1928)
 Dumitru Boabeș, politician (b. 1951)
 27 October – Nicolae Coman, composer, teacher, poet, translator and musicologist (b. 1936)
 30 October – Iustinian Chira, bishop (b. 1921)

November

December

 8 December – Romulus Rusan, writer (b. 1935)

See also 

List of Romanian films of 2016
2016 in the European Union
2016 in Europe
Romania in the Eurovision Song Contest 2016
Romania at the 2016 Summer Olympics
Romania at the 2016 Summer Paralympics
Romania at the 2016 Winter Youth Olympics

References

External links

 
2010s in Romania
Years of the 21st century in Romania
Romania
Romania